José Ruy Matias Pinto (9 May 1930 – 23 November 2022) was a Portuguese comic book author. He had been active since the end of the 1940s.

Works
1a Exposição portuguesa de histórias aos quadradinhos e ilustração infantil (1952)
A Lei da Selva (2016)

References

1930 births
2022 deaths
Portuguese male writers
People from Amadora